Simone Bolelli and Andreas Seppi chose to not defend their 2008 title.
Karol Beck and Jaroslav Levinský won in the final 7–6(6), 6–4, against Chris Haggard and Pavel Vízner.

Seeds

Draw

Draw

External links
 Doubles Draw

Internazionali di Tennis di Bergamo - Doubles
2009 Doubles